Elaine Walker may refer to:

Elaine Walker (composer) (born 1969), American composer
Elaine Walker (politician) (born 1951), American politician
Elaine F. Walker, American psychologist